Krasny Yar is a rural locality (a village) in Polozovoskoye Rural Settlement, Bolshesosnovsky District, Perm Krai, Russia. The population was 352 as of 2010. There are 7 streets.

Geography 
It is located 4 km north-east from Polozovo.

References 

Rural localities in Bolshesosnovsky District